Brando Quilici is an independent Italian filmmaker whose career spans over two decades, during which he has worked on many specials for American networks including the National Geographic Channel, Discovery Channel, PBS [NOVA] and European networks including Channel 4,  ZDF, France 5, Rai.

He has won many awards, including prizes at the Jackson Hole Film Festival and Trento Film Festival.

In 2013 Brando, with Academy Award-winning producer Jake Ebert, produced The Journey Home a family action-adventure feature film set among the ice fields of the Canadian Arctic.  Directed by Roger Spottiswoode (Tomorrow Never Dies) and Brando Quilici, the film stars Dakota Goyo (Real Steel), Goran Visnjic (“ER”) and Bridget Moynahan (Blue Bloods). written by the Academy Award winner Hugh Hudson. The film is now available on all major US Digital Accounts and DVD, and distributed theatrically in over 35 countries.

References

External links

http://brandoquilici.com/
https://web.archive.org/web/20160109054814/http://brandoquilicifilms.com/
http://www.imdb.com/name/nm1306256/?ref_=fn_al_nm_1
http://www.comingsoon.it/personaggi/brando-quilici/243612/biografia/

Year of birth missing (living people)
Living people
Place of birth missing (living people)